A by-election was held for the New South Wales Legislative Assembly seat of Temora on Saturday 8 October 1960 and was triggered by the death of Doug Dickson, who had been Deputy Leader of the party until 1958.

The Kurri Kurri by-election was held on the same day.

Dates

Result

Doug Dickson died.

See also
Electoral results for the district of Temora
List of New South Wales state by-elections

References

New South Wales state by-elections
1960 elections in Australia
1960s in New South Wales
October 1960 events in Australia